Ferdinand Renier (born 6 December 1906) was a Belgian weightlifter. He competed at the 1928 Summer Olympics in the featherweight category (under 60 kg) and finished in 12th place.

References

External links
  

Olympic weightlifters of Belgium
Weightlifters at the 1928 Summer Olympics
Belgian male weightlifters
1906 births
Year of death missing